Arcitalitrus is a genus of beach hoppers in the family Talitridae. There are nine described species in Arcitalitrus.

Species
These nine species belong to the genus Arcitalitrus:
 Arcitalitrus bassianus Friend, 1987
 Arcitalitrus belbucca Peart & Lowry, 2006
 Arcitalitrus bundeena Peart & Lowry, 2006
 Arcitalitrus dorrieni (Hunt, 1925)
 Arcitalitrus moonpar Peart & Lowry, 2006
 Arcitalitrus nana Peart & Lowry, 2006
 Arcitalitrus orara Peart & Lowry, 2006
 Arcitalitrus sylvaticus (Haswell, 1879) (lawn shrimp)
 Arcitalitrus thora Peart & Lowry, 2006

References

Further reading

 
 

Amphipoda
Articles created by Qbugbot